Acraea insularis is a butterfly in the family Nymphalidae. It is found on the island of São Tomé. The species was first named in 1893 by Emily Mary Bowdler Sharpe.

Description
 
A. insularis E. Sharpe. Forewing above black-brown with a yellow transverse spot in the middle of the cell and a similar orange-yellow spot at its apex, an orange-yellow spot in the basal part of 2, a free, crescentic, small spot in 1 b near the distal margin and three small orange-yellow subapical spots in 4-6, of which the one in 4 is placed nearer to the distal margin and quite free. The hind wing above at the base blackish as far as vein 2, then with a broad median band about 5 mm. in breadth, at the inner margin and towards the base light yellow, distally orange-yellow, projecting almost rectangularly distad in cellule 4 (almost as in johnstoni) and adorned with black discal dots; the hindwing beneath light yellowish to the base with free black dots and beyond the middle with a broad blackish transverse band, which is separated from the distal margin by a fine light line; this light marginal line is broken up into small spots by the dark veins and the streaks on the internearal folds. Island of Sao Thome.

Taxonomy
It is a member of the Acraea jodutta species group - but see also Pierre & Bernaud, 2014

References

External links

Images representing Acraea insularis at Bold.

Butterflies described in 1893
insularis
Butterflies of Africa
Endemic fauna of São Tomé Island